Ella Barbro Tano (born 30 November 1939) is a retired Swedish cross-country skier. She competed in the 5 km and 10 km events at the 1968 and 1972 Winter Olympics and finished in 10–19th place.

Cross-country skiing results

Olympic Games

References

1939 births
Living people
Cross-country skiers at the 1968 Winter Olympics
Cross-country skiers at the 1972 Winter Olympics
Olympic cross-country skiers of Sweden
Swedish female cross-country skiers
20th-century Swedish women